The Hong Kong Railway Museum is a railway museum in Tai Po, Hong Kong. It is now under the management of the Leisure and Cultural Service Department. Opened on 20 December 1985, it is located at the site where the old Tai Po Market railway station was built in 1913. Admission to the museum is free.

History
The Kowloon–Canton Railway (British Section) opened in 1910 in Tai Po Market was one of the stops in the New Territories. The station building was erected in 1913. Since then, it has acted as a centre of administration and trade, which indirectly boosted Tai Po Market's economy by bringing traders there.

The Kowloon–Canton Railway was electrified in 1983 and the station was taken out of service, with the opening of the new Tai Wo station north of it and the new Tai Po Market station south of it. One year later, the Old Tai Po Market Railway Station was declared a monument.

The museum opened on 20 December 1985.

Architecture
The building of the station is unique in the way of architectural style among original Kowloon–Canton Railway (British Section). It is of indigenous Chinese architectural style, with many small figures decorating the exterior, such as are commonly found in existing old southern Chinese temples.

Exhibits

Inside the museum
On the left of the museum, there is an exhibition room of train tickets and train models of not only KCR trains but also Japanese Shinkansen and Eurostar. The further internal part of the room is a refurbished ticket office and signalling house.

Vehicles on the track

Two locomotives are on exhibition at the museum:
 EMD G12 Diesel-electric locomotive #51, introduced in Hong Kong in 1955, which is called "Sir Alexander", named after former Governor Alexander Grantham. This was the first diesel electric locomotive in Hong Kong and marked KCR's transition from steam to diesel. After a new batch of diesel locomotives arrived in Hong Kong in late 2003, the Sir Alexander retired from service. KCR Corporation staff spent more than 1000 hours restoring it to its original 1955 appearance, removing rust, repainting it dark green, and restoring the traditional logo. It was donated to the museum on 18 May 2004.
 A W. G. Bagnall 0-4-4PT narrow gauge steam locomotive, restored from the Philippines in 1995. The locomotive is one of two that formerly ran on the narrow gauge Sha Tau Kok Railway line between Fanling and Sha Tau Kok. When that closed, they were used by sugar mills in the Philippines. The other locomotive of the pair was also brought back to Hong Kong and is reported to be undergoing restoration.

There are seven coaches on the tracks for public viewing and appreciation of the contrast between the old and the new. 
 A 1911 third-class coach, #302
 A 1921 engineering brake coach, #002
 A 1921 third-class coach, #313
 A 1955 third-class coach, #223 (an educational video room)
 A 1955 luggage coach, #229
 A 1964 first-class coach, #112
 A 1976 ordinary-class coach, #276

There are also a pump trolley and a diesel-engined railcar.

A 1:1 scale model of a non-refurbished East Rail line Metro Cammell EMU was once on display at the Museum, but was removed to make space for locomotive #51.

Gallery

See also
List of museums in Hong Kong
Tai Wo, the local area which the former station was situated

References

External links 

    
 Attractions in Tai Po
 Hong Kong Antiquities and Declared Monuments
 Image Gallery

Museums established in 1985
History museums in Hong Kong
Declared monuments of Hong Kong
KCR East Rail
Tai Po
Railway museums in Hong Kong
1985 establishments in Hong Kong
Railway stations opened in 1913
Railway stations closed in 1983
1913 establishments in Hong Kong